Nikola Rozynska (born 31 August 1998) is a Polish professional racing cyclist. She rode in the women's team pursuit event at the 2017 UCI Track Cycling World Championships.

References

External links
 

1998 births
Living people
Polish female cyclists
Place of birth missing (living people)
21st-century Polish women